The 76th edition of the KNVB Cup started on August 28, 1993. The final was played on May 12, 1994: Feyenoord beat NEC 2–1 and won the cup for the ninth time. A total of 63 clubs participated.

Teams
 All 18 participants of the Eredivisie 1993-94, eleven of which entering in the third round, the rest entering in the second round
 All 18 participants of the Eerste Divisie 1993-94, entering in the second round
 One youth team, entering in the second round
 26 teams from lower (amateur) leagues, five of which entering in the second round

First round
The matches of the first round were played on August 28 and 29, 1993. Only amateur teams participated.

Second round
The matches of the second round were played on October 8, 9 and 10, 1993. Except for eleven Eredivisie teams, all other participants entered the tournament here.

E Eredivisie; 1 Eerste Divisie; A Amateur teams

Third round
The matches of the third round were played on November 10, 11 and 14, 1993. The eleven highest ranked Eredivisie clubs from last season entered the tournament this round.

E eleven Eredivisie entrants

Round of 16
The matches of the round of 16 were played on December 15, 1993, and on January 9 and January 12, 1994.

Quarter finals
The quarter finals were played on February 9, 1994.

Semi-finals
The semi-finals were played on March 9 and 20, 1994.

Final

Feyenoord would participate in the Cup Winners' Cup.

See also
Eredivisie 1993-94
Eerste Divisie 1993-94

External links
 Netherlands Cup Full Results 1970–1994 by the RSSSF
 Results by Ronald Zwiers  

1993-94
1993–94 domestic association football cups
1993–94 in Dutch football